Liolaemus parthenos is a species of lizard in the family Iguanidae.  It is endemic to Argentina.

References

parthenos
Lizards of South America
Reptiles of Argentina
Endemic fauna of Argentina
Reptiles described in 2016
Taxa named by Cristian Simón Abdala